Rastić is a Serbo-Croatian surname, derived from hrast ("oak") or rastiti ("to grow"). It may refer to:

Damir Rastić (born 1988), Serbian biathlete
Resti (family), Ragusan family

Serbian surnames
Croatian surnames